Wark railway station is a disused railway station which served the village of Wark on Tyne, Northumberland, England. Located on the Border Counties Railway, the station was possibly opened on 1 December 1859, but was definitely open by 1 April 1860. The station was originally connected to the village by a wooden bridge over the River Tyne but this was replaced by an iron bridge in 1878. There was a single platform, a small goods shed with a signal box being added in 1896. It was closed to passengers on 15 October 1956 and completely on 1 September 1958.

The station building and platforms are still intact, the former now used as a private residence.

References

Disused railway stations in Northumberland
Former North British Railway stations
Railway stations in Great Britain opened in 1860
Railway stations in Great Britain closed in 1956